X22 or X-22 may refer to:

 Bell X-22, an American experimental tilt-fan aircraft of the 1960s
 Kh-22 (AS-4 'Kitchen'), an anti-ship missile developed by the Soviet Union
 Paul Magriel (born 1946; nicknamed "X-22"), American professional backgammon and poker player
 \x22, the quotation mark (Unicode codepoint hex &x22;)

See also

 General Aircraft Hotspur X.22/40; military glider
 
 
 X2 (disambiguation)